Spectacle Lake is a lake in Isanti County, in the U.S. state of Minnesota. It was so named on account of its outline being shaped like a pair of spectacles.

Spectacle Lake Wildlife Management Area is next to the lake, midway between the cities of Princeton and Cambridge, Minnesota.

See also
List of lakes in Minnesota

References

Lakes of Minnesota
Lakes of Isanti County, Minnesota